John Brickwood may refer to:

Sir John Brickwood, 1st Baronet (1852–1932), of the Brickwood baronets and first chairman of Portsmouth F.C.
John Brickwood (businessman) (1721–1786), associate of John Strettell

See also
Brickwood